The South American Basketball Championship 1963 was the 19th edition of this regional tournament. It was held from February 14 to March 4 in Lima, Peru. Nine teams competed.

Results
The final standings were determined by a round robin, where the 9 teams played against each other once.

References
FIBA Archive

1963
Championship
International basketball competitions hosted by Peru
1963 in Peruvian sport
Sports competitions in Lima
1960s in Lima
February 1963 sports events in South America
March 1963 sports events in South America